Rick Wayne Titus (born 10 March 1969) is a Canadian-born Trinidadian soccer coach and former professional player. He played as a defender. He is the former head coach of the Masters FA League 1 team after winning a championship in 2019, and University of Toronto Mississauga soccer team. Born with Indigenous ancestry, he announced he will be changing his name to Netshetep Ma'at, which is an Ancient Egyptian Order name as well as Songan Ohitekha Tawa El (which means Strong Brave Sun), an Indigenous Appellation name.

Throughout his playing career he competed in all levels of the American and Canadian soccer pyramid system. Originally beginning in his native country in the National Soccer League, soon after to the USL A-League, and eventually reaching the highest level of soccer in North America with the Major League Soccer. After reaching the MLS, he would shift between various United Soccer Leagues clubs, until returning to the MLS on a loan deal and appeared in a single match at the age of 39. He would concluded his outdoor career in the USL Premier Development League and Canadian Soccer League. Titus also competed in indoor soccer with various clubs in the National Professional Soccer League, and played at the international level with the Trinidad and Tobago national football team.

After his retirement from competitive soccer he made the transition to the managerial side. He received his first experience in coaching as a player/assistant coach for the Toronto Lynx in the PDL in 2007. He later joined the TFC Academy managerial staff as the U14 head coach, and subsequently began coaching in League1 Ontario initially with North Mississauga SC.

Playing career

Early years: 1986–1996 
After playing college soccer with the University of Toronto he signed with the Toronto Blizzard, but due to shortage of funds he ended up playing his youth soccer after three months; he then signed for the Toronto Italia in 1988 of the National Soccer League playing with Italia until 1995. In 1995, midway through the season he was traded to the Scarborough Astros. During his tenure in Scarborough he helped the club reach the Umbro Cup finals against St. Catharines Wolves, but lost the penalty shootout by a score of 3–0. In 1996, Titus signed with St. Catharines Wolves where he claimed the Umbro cup by finishing first in the cup standings. He featured in the two game finals match against his former club Toronto Italia, but were defeated by a score of 11–0 goals on aggregate.

He began playing indoor soccer in 1996 in the National Professional Soccer League with the Toronto Shooting Stars. During the season he was traded to the Edmonton Drillers, where he would eventually have a noted tenure by playing three separate seasons with the organization. Where he became a league all star in the 1999–2000 season, but later was selected by the Buffalo Blizzard in the dispersal draft after the folding of Edmonton. However the Blizzard would fold at the end of the season and the Milwaukee Wave selected Titus in the August 2001 dispersal draft.

USL A-League: 1997–2001 
In the spring of 1997 he signed for the newly established Toronto Lynx of the USL A-League. In his two year stint he was named the 1997 and 1998 Lynx Defensive Player of the Year. In the winter off season he continued to playing the NPSL with the Montreal Impact in 1997, and was later traded to the Buffalo Blizzard.

In 1998, he went overseas to play for Quan Li, a team managed by former Lynx teammate Gong Lei in China.  After a brief stint abroad he returned to the NPSL to play with Philadelphia KiXX for the 1998–1999 indoor season. Titus moved to the Hershey Wildcats for the 1999 A-League season, but was traded midway through the season to Staten Island Vipers for cash and a first round draft pick. On June 13, 2000 Titus signed for the Vancouver 86er, where he was named Vancouver's 2000 Defensive Player of the Year and Second Team All A-League. In 2001, he was named the A-League Defender of the Year and First Team All A-League.

When the 2000 A-League season came to a conclusion he was loaned out to the Toronto Olympians in the Canadian Professional Soccer League. He made his debut for the club in the Open Canada Cup semi-final match against the Toronto Croatia, which resulted in 3–2 victory for the club in penalties. He appeared in the Open Cup tournament final against his former club St. Catharines, and won the cup in a 1–0 victory. In the postseason he scored the lone goal in the semi-final match against Glen Shields, which advanced Toronto to the finals. In the finals the Olympians where defeated by Toronto Croatia by a score of 2–1.

MLS and USL First Division: 2002–2006 
This brought Titus to the attention of Major League Soccer scouts and he signed with the Colorado Rapids as a Discovery Player for the 2002 season.  He started all 25 games in which he played, and at the end of the season he was awarded the ADT Defensive Player of the Year award.  The Rapids put him on waivers in October 2002. On March 12, 2003, Titus signed a two-year contract with the Charleston Battery, helping them win the 2003 USL A-League Championship. At the end of the season he requested a release from his contract to join the Edmonton Aviators, and signed a three-year contract.

Shortly into the season he was released from his contract, and on June 19, 2004, he returned to the Toronto Lynx. After less than a week with the Lynx, he fell out with the management which led his release from his contract by mutual consent on July 7.  He then rejoined the Charleston Battery for the remainder of the season. The following season he returned to the Lynx for a third playing stint. In 2006, Titus became team vice-captain, and featured in the Open Canada Cup final against Ottawa St. Anthony Italia. At the conclusion of the season he was named the 2006 Toronto Lynx Most Valuable Player, and was a four-time member of the United Soccer League's team of the week.

PDL and CSL: 2007–2010 
When the 2006 season ended the Lynx organization decided for financial reasons to drop two divisions to the Premier Development League. Titus was one of few seniors players to remain with the Lynx for the 2007 season, where he was named player/assistant coach for Toronto.  In 2008, Titus helped the Lynx reach the playoffs for the first time since 2000, but unfortunately for the Lynx, the Cleveland Internationals scored a late winner to take the game 2–1, sending the Lynx home early.

In 2008, he went on loan to Toronto FC for one game against Chivas USA in Major League Soccer. This was due to Toronto missing nine first-team players due to international duty, and in order to protect his amateur status he was unpaid for his Toronto FC appearance. After the conclusion of the PDL season he returned to the Canadian Soccer League and signed with the York Region Shooters. During his tenure with York Region he helped clinch the International Division title in 2008, and the regular season title in 2010. He was awarded the CSL Defender of the Year award in 2010.

International career 
He made his international debut for the Trinidad and Tobago national team on November 15, 2002 against St. Kitts and Nevis national football team in the 2003 CONCACAF Gold Cup qualification. He later played in four Gold Cup qualifier games in 2002.

Managerial career  
In 2012 Rick Titus would coach the 98 boys youth team at North Mississauga Soccer Club. The team would go on to win the Ontario Cup and eventually the Canadian National Championship. Also, the 98 boys would also be named the number one sports team at the Mississauga Sports Council banquet. 
In 2007, he gained his first experience in managing at a professional club as an assistant coach for the Toronto Lynx in the USL Premier Development League under Duncan Wilde. He later was appointed the head coach for the TFC Academy U14 team, and also a regional scout for the Mississauga/Brampton region. In 2016, he became the head coach for North Mississauga SC in League1 Ontario, and was named the head coach for the University of Toronto Mississauga men's team. In 2017, he was appointed the head coach for Masters FA Saints. In the 2017 winter season he was appointed head coach for Caribbean Stars AC in the Arena Premier League. During the 2021 League 1 Ontario season Titus received a year suspension due to an off-field altercation with match officials.

In 2019, he replaced Phil Ionadi as head coach for the Mississauga MetroStars in the Major Arena Soccer League.
In 2019, he would go on to win the League 1 Ontario Championship with Masters FA
In 2021, he would go on to the semi-finals of the League 1 Ontario Championship, losing to the eventual 2021 Champions from Guelph

References

1969 births
Living people
Soccer players from Mississauga
Trinidad and Tobago footballers
Trinidad and Tobago international footballers
Canadian soccer players
Canadian sportspeople of Trinidad and Tobago descent
Citizens of Trinidad and Tobago through descent
Association football defenders
Buffalo Blizzard players
Philadelphia KiXX (NPSL) players
Hershey Wildcats players
Staten Island Vipers players
Colorado Rapids players
Charleston Battery players
National Professional Soccer League (1984–2001) players
A-League (1995–2004) players
Major League Soccer players
Trinidad and Tobago expatriate footballers
Trinidad and Tobago expatriate sportspeople in the United States
Expatriate soccer players in the United States
Trinidad and Tobago football managers
Canadian expatriate soccer players
Canadian expatriate sportspeople in the United States
Canadian National Soccer League players
Canadian Soccer League (1998–present) players
Black Canadian soccer players
Edmonton Aviators / F.C. players
Edmonton Drillers (1996–2000) players
York Region Shooters players
Montreal Impact (1992–2011) players
North York Astros players
St. Catharines Roma Wolves players
Toronto FC non-playing staff
Toronto FC players
Toronto Italia players
Toronto Lynx players
Toronto (Mississauga) Olympians players
Toronto Shooting Stars players
University of Toronto alumni
USL First Division players
USL League Two players
Vancouver Whitecaps (1986–2010) players
North Mississauga SC players